Bradley (Brad) Grant Trivers (born 22 December 1971) is a Canadian politician, who was elected to the Legislative Assembly of Prince Edward Island in the 2015 provincial election. He represents the electoral district of Rustico-Emerald as a member of the Progressive Conservative Party.

He was previously the party's candidate in the same district for the 2011 election, losing to incumbent MLA Carolyn Bertram.

Prior to his election to the legislature, Trivers ran an information technology consulting business in New Glasgow. He is a graduate of the University of Waterloo.

Trivers was defeated for the leadership of the Progressive Conservative Party, in 2017 by James Aylward.

On May 9, 2019, Trivers was appointed to the Executive Council of Prince Edward Island as Minister of Education and Lifelong Learning and Minister of Environment, Water and Climate Change.

Electoral record

References

Living people
People from Queens County, Prince Edward Island
Progressive Conservative Party of Prince Edward Island MLAs
Members of the Executive Council of Prince Edward Island
University of Waterloo alumni
21st-century Canadian politicians
1971 births